The 2012 Colorado Rapids season is the team's eighteenth year of existence. The team's first match was on March 10 at Dick's Sporting Goods Park.

Background

Review

Competitions

Preseason

Hawaiian Islands Invitational

Major League Soccer

Results summary

Results by round

Match results

Table
Western Conference

Overall

MLS Cup Playoffs

U.S. Open Cup

Statistics

Appearances and goals

Roster & Transfers

Roster 
Roster on October 1, 2012.

In

MLS Drafts

Out

Loan in

Loan out

Miscellany

Allocation ranking 
Colorado is in the #14 position in the MLS Allocation Ranking. The allocation ranking is the mechanism used to determine which MLS club has first priority to acquire a U.S. National Team player who signs with MLS after playing abroad, or a former MLS player who returns to the league after having gone to a club abroad for a transfer fee. A ranking can be traded, provided that part of the compensation received in return is another club’s ranking.

International roster spots 
Colorado has 7 MLS International Roster Slots for use in the 2012 season. Each club in Major League Soccer is allocated 8 international roster slots. Colorado acquired an additional permanent slot from Real Salt Lake in 2005, traded slots to Vancouver Whitecaps FC in both 2010 and 2012, and traded another slot to New York Red Bulls in 2010. In July 2012, Colorado acquired a slot from Portland Timbers which returns to Portland on 1 January 2013.

Future draft pick trades 
Future picks acquired: * 2013 MLS SuperDraft Round 4 pick from Houston Dynamo; * 2014 MLS SuperDraft conditional pick from Houston Dynamo.
Future picks traded: * 2013 Supplemental Draft Round 3 pick to Vancouver Whitecaps FC; * 2014 MLS SuperDraft Round 2 pick to Vancouver Whitecaps FC.

See also 
 2012 in American soccer
 Colorado Rapids

References

External links

Colorado Rapids
Colorado Rapids seasons
Colorado Rapids